Chakzam or Chaksam or Jagsam means "iron bridge" in the Tibetan language. It could refer to:

 Chushul Chakzam near Lhasa, one of the first bridges of its kind built by Thang Tong Gyalpo in 1430
 Jagsamka Township in Riwoqê County
 Luding County in Sichuan province, whose Tibetan name is Chagsam due to the iron bridge
 Thang Tong Gyalpo, also known as Chakzampa, a Bhutanese lama who built 58 iron bridges

See also

 Iron Bridge (disambiguation)